Guillermo Vilas defeated Björn Borg 3–6, 6–7, 6–4, 6–6 after Borg retired to win the 1973 ATP Buenos Aires singles competition. Karl Meiler was the champion but did not defend his title.

Draw
 NB: All rounds up to but not including the semifinals were the best of 3 sets. The semifinals and final were the best of 5 sets.

Final

Section 1

Section 2

External links
 ATP Singles draw

Singles
1973 in Argentine tennis